= Rogen–Franco =

Rogen–Franco refers to the collaboration between the actors:

- Seth Rogen
- James Franco
